Alexander Millar (21 October 1911 – 28 January 1977) was a Scottish footballer who played as a centre half.

Career
Born with the surname Urbonis, Millar was a member of North Lanarkshire's Lithuanian immigrant community. After playing with several local Junior teams until the age of 23, he began his senior career with Celtic in 1935, where he was a reserve behind Willie Lyon in the queue for selection; he made five appearances as the club won the 1937–38 Scottish Division One title, but it is doubtful that he would have been presented with a medal. With the situation unchanged going into the following campaign he moved on, joining Preston North End in October 1938. He had little time to become established in English football prior to the outbreak of World War II ten months later, and during the conflict he appeared as a guest player for Scottish clubs including Celtic and Motherwell, featuring for the latter in the 1945 Southern League Cup Final which ended in defeat by Rangers.

In 1946 Millar signed for Scottish Division B side Dundee United, transferring back up to the top tier with Morton in late 1947 and playing for them in the 1948 Scottish Cup Final – again losing out to Rangers, this time after extra time in a replay; his performance in both matches against his internationalist opponents Billy Williamson and Willie Thornton, at the age of 36, was singled out for particular praise in press reports. After Morton were relegated in the 1948–49 season, he moved on to Stranraer for a short spell prior to retiring.

Millar also served as chairman of the Scottish Football Players Union in the post-war period. He was the first of several Scots of Lithuanian descent to play for Celtic between the 1930s and 1960s, all of them defenders, the most famous being Billy McNeill.

References

1911 births
1977 deaths
Footballers from Bellshill
Association football central defenders
Scottish footballers
Scottish people of Lithuanian descent
Celtic F.C. players
Parkhead F.C. players
Greenock Morton F.C. players
Shawfield F.C. players
Dundee United F.C. players
Stranraer F.C. players
Preston North End F.C. players
Celtic F.C. wartime guest players
Motherwell F.C. wartime guest players
Albion Rovers F.C. wartime guest players
Scottish Junior Football Association players
Scottish Football League players
English Football League players
Scottish trade unionists